Enzo Serafin (16 April 1912, Venice – 27 December 1995, Rome) was an Italian cinematographer, who cooperated with Michelangelo Antonioni (Cronaca di un amore (1950), La signora senza camelie (1953), I vinti (1953)), Roberto Rossellini (Viaggio in Italia (1954)), Ricardo Gascón, Ignacio F. Iquino, Luigi Zampa, Gianni Franciolini, Alfredo Guarini and others. He was a cinematographer of several parts of Les Sept péchés capitaux (1962) and Siamo donne (1953). In 1953 Enzo Serafin won Silver Ribbon for his works.

Selected filmography
 Forbidden Music (1942)
 Gentleman Thief (1946)
 When the Angels Sleep (1947)
 Unexpected Conflict (1948)
 That Luzmela Girl (1949)
 Child of the Night (1950)
 A Thief Has Arrived (1950)
 The Temptress (1952)
 Husband and Wife (1952)
 Journey to Italy (1954)
 Condemned to Sin (1964)

References

External links

1912 births
1995 deaths
Film people from Venice
Italian cinematographers
Nastro d'Argento winners